The 2015 PSA Annual Awards is an accolade organized by the Philippine Sportswriters Association, the oldest media organization based in the Philippines, helmed by the president Jun Lumibao of Business Mirror, in cooperation with the Philippine Sports Commission, Smart Communications, San Miguel Corporation, Milo, MVP Sports Foundation and Meralco. The awards will be given to the Philippine sportsmen who recognize their achievements in 2014.

Known as the "Oscars" of Philippine sports, the awards proper was held at the One Esplanade, Mall of Asia Complex, Pasay on February 16, 2015. Veteran sportscasters Quinito Henson and Patricia Bermudez-Hizon will be served as the emcees of the formal program. PSC Chairman Richie Garcia was invited to become a guest of honor in the said event, Philippine Olympic Committee chairman Peping Cojuangco is also part of the honorable guests. NU Pep Squad, the 2014 UAAP Cheerdance Competition champion has been performed during the awarding.

Asian Games gold medalist Daniel Caluag was named as the Athlete of the Year, the first time in 7 years where only one athlete was recognized by the PSA as the top sportsman of the year after Manny Pacquiao, in 2008.

Honor Roll list

Special awards
The following list is the special awards given in the PSA Annual Awards.

Major citations

Tony Siddayao Awards for Under 17 athletes

Minor citations

Posthumous awards
The Posthumous awards is given to the sports personalities who died in 2014. They will given an award and a one-minute silence for the honorees.

Ely Capacio (former PBA executive and player, died February 23, ruptured aneurysm)
Bryan Gahol (former MBA & PBA player and Laguna politician, died March 31, car accident)
Rodolfo Lordan, Jr. (snooker, died April 5, "bangungot")
Anthony Villanueva (1964 Summer Olympics silver medalist for Boxing, died May 13, heart failure)
Enzo Pastor (racing car champion, died June 12, ambushed)
Kurt Bachmann (basketball player and part of the 1962 Asian Games men's basketball team, died August 29, complications from diabetes)
Isabelo Hilario (drag race car driver, died December 3, ambushed)
Howie Basilio (Manila Chronicle sports writer, died December 11, cause of death withheld)
Danny Romero (PTV 4 and Silverstar Sports commentator and sports writer)

See also
2014 in Philippine sports
PSA Sportsman of the Year

References

2014 in Philippine sport
PSA Annual Awards